The Kentucky Bourbon Trail (sometimes informally shortened to "the Bourbon Trail") is the name of a program sponsored by the Kentucky Distillers' Association (KDA) to promote the Bourbon whiskey industry in Kentucky. The KDA has registered the phrase "Kentucky Bourbon Trail" as a protected trademark.

History
The KDA launched the Kentucky Bourbon Trail program in 1999. At the time, it included seven of the eight distilleries in the region. In 2008, an eighth distillery, the Barton 1792 Distillery, joined the Trail program. However, the distillery was purchased by the Sazerac Company the following year, and Sazerac withdrew both the Barton 1792 Distillery and the Buffalo Trace Distillery from the KDA at the beginning of 2010. The two Sazerac distilleries continue to host public tours, and a Sazerac spokesperson stated they still feel they are "very much a part of the Bourbon Trail", but Sazerac wishes to promote its distilleries independent of the KDA.

In August 2012, the Town Branch Distillery was added to the trail, bringing the number of distilleries back to seven. The Heaven Hill Evan Williams distillery in Louisville was added in May 2013, expanding the primary tour program to include eight destinations. In 2014, The Bulleit Experience at Stitzel-Weller Distillery joined the Kentucky Bourbon Trail, raising the number to nine destinations. In June 2018, Old Forester opened an urban distillery in downtown Louisville and became a member of the Bourbon Trail. O.Z. Tyler Distillery in Owensboro joined the same month. In July 2018, the KDA announced that Lux Row Distillers would be added to the Kentucky Bourbon Trail.

In October 2012, the KDA announced that it would expand the Kentucky Bourbon Trail program to include a new "Craft Tour" of seven artisan distilleries. 2012 had the highest-ever rate of completion for participation in the trail. In December 2013, the Craft Tour added Danville's Wilderness Trail Distillery, thereby expanding to eight destinations. Several other distilleries have been added and the Bowling Green branch of Corsair Artisan Distillery closed on August 30, 2018, bringing the current number to 13 destinations on the Craft Tour.

The KDA opened an official welcome center for the Bourbon Trail in August 2018 at the Frazier History Museum in downtown Louisville.

Trail member sites
The program sends free T-shirts to people who mail in a promotional "passport" that has been stamped by all the participating distilleries.

As of 2019, the destinations on the main Bourbon Trail are:

 Angel's Envy Distillery in Louisville
 Bardstown Bourbon Company in Bardstown
 Bulleit Distilling Co. in Shelbyville
 Bulleit Frontier Experience at the Stitzel–Weller Distillery in Louisville
 Evan Williams Bourbon Experience in Louisville
 Four Roses Distillery in Lawrenceburg
 Green River Distilling Co. in Owensboro
 Heaven Hill Visitor Center in Bardstown
 Jim Beam American Stillhouse in Clermont
 Lux Row Distillers in Bardstown
 Maker's Mark Distillery in Loretto
 Michter’s Fort Nelson Distillery in Louisville
 Old Forester Distilling Co. in Louisville
 O.Z. Tyler Distillery in Owensboro
 Rabbit Hole Distillery in Louisville
 Town Branch Distillery in Lexington
 Wild Turkey Distillery in Lawrenceburg
 Woodford Reserve Distillery near Versailles 

The members of the Bourbon Trail "Craft Tour" are:

 Barrel House Distilling Co. in Lexington
 Bluegrass Distillers in Lexington
 Boone County Distilling Co. in Boone County
 Boundary Oak in Radcliff
 Casey Jones in Hopkinsville
 Castle & Key in Frankfort
 Dueling Grounds Distillery in Franklin
 Hartfield & Co. in Paris
 James E. Pepper in Lexington
 Jeptha Creed Distillery in Shelbyville
 Kentucky Artisan Distillery in Crestwood
 Kentucky Peerless Distilling Company in Louisville
 Limestone Branch Distillery in Lebanon
 MB Roland Distillery, Pembroke (Christian County)
 Neeley Family Distillery in Sparta
 New Riff Distillery in Newport
 Old Pogue Distillery in Maysville
 Preservation Distillery in Bardstown
 Second Sight Spirits in Ludlow
 Wilderness Trail Distillery in Danville
 Willett Distillery in Bardstown

See also

 American Whiskey Trail

References

External links

Kentucky Bourbon Trail official website from the Kentucky Distillers' Association

Bourbon whiskey
Tourism in Kentucky
1999 establishments in Kentucky
Heritage trails
Whisky trails